
Year 847 (DCCCXLVII) was a common year starting on Saturday (link will display the full calendar) of the Julian calendar.

Events 
 By place 
 Europe 
 Danish Vikings land in the Breton March (western part of Gaul). Duke Nominoe of Brittany fails to withstand them in battle, but succeeds in buying them off with gifts and persuading them to leave (approximate date).
 Viking period: The Vikings plunder the Lower Rhine, as part of their attacks on the Empire of Francia.
 The Saracens, under the Berber leader Kalfun, capture the Byzantine city of Bari (Southern Italy). He becomes the first ruler of the Emirate of Bari, and expands his influence on the Italian mainland with raids.

 Abbasid Caliphate 
 August 10 – Caliph Al-Wathiq dies of dropsy after a five-year reign. He is succeeded by his brother al-Mutawakkil.

 By topic 
 Natural events 

 November 24 – 847 Damascus earthquake

 Religion 
 January 24 – Pope Sergius II dies of gout after a 3-year reign. He is succeeded by Leo IV, as the 103rd pope of Rome.
 April 21– Rabanus Maurus, a Frankish Benedictine monk, becomes archbishop of Mainz after the death of Odgar.

Births 
 Æthelred I, king of Wessex (approximate date)
 Al-Mu'tazz, Muslim caliph (d. 869)
 Charles the Child, king of Aquitaine (or 848)
 Cheng Ji, Chinese general (approximate date)
 Fujiwara no Sukeyo, Japanese aristocrat (d. 897)
 Kang Junli, general of the Tang Dynasty (d. 894)
 Lu Yi, chancellor of the Tang Dynasty (d. 905)
 Miyoshi Kiyotsura, Japanese scholar (d. 918)
 Wang Jian, emperor of Former Shu (d. 918)
 Wang Jingchong, Chinese general (d. 883)

Deaths 
 January 27 – Sergius II, pope of the Catholic Church (b. 790)
 April 21 – Odgar, Frankish monk and archbishop
 June 1 – Xiao, empress of the Tang Dynasty
 June 14 – Methodius I, patriarch of Constantinople
 August 10 – Al-Wathiq, Muslim caliph (b. 816)
 Fedelmid mac Crimthainn, king of Munster (Ireland)
 Frothar of Toul, Frankish bishop (approximate date)
 Hetto, Frankish archbishop (approximate date)
 Isa ibn Mansur al-Rafi'i, Muslim governor
 Muhammad ibn al-Zayyat, Abbasid vizier
 Li Rangyi, chancellor of the Tang Dynasty
 Theodemar of Iria, Galician bishop

References

Citations

Bibliography